Alexander Marcou (born 6 July 1958) is a former Australian rules footballer. He played with Carlton and St Kilda in the Victorian Football League (VFL) during the 1980s.

Marcou is a member of the Carlton Hall of Fame and represented Victoria at interstate football on three occasions. Marcou made his VFL debut for Carlton at the age of 20 in 1979, kicking 34 goals and finishing the year a premiership player. He was a rover and played in premiership winning sides again in 1981 and 1982.
 
In 1987, his first season at St Kilda was a good one for Marcou and he was a fine contributor in a young team. Frustration returned in 1988 however, as more serious hamstring and calf injuries reappeared. Reluctantly, he realised it was time to retire after adding another 24 games and 17 goals to his tally in two seasons at Moorabbin.

In 1989 after retiring from league football, Marcou played at Victorian Football Association club Springvale, the club was being coached by premiership teammate Phil Maylin. He later returned to Carlton as an energetic and active member of the past players. In 2006 he was a popular choice for induction into the Carlton Hall of Fame.

Marcou's parents were Macedonian immigrants from the village Perasma, in the Florina region of Greece .

References

1958 births
Living people
Carlton Football Club players
Carlton Football Club Premiership players
St Kilda Football Club players
Australian rules footballers from Victoria (Australia)
Australian people of Macedonian descent
Slavic speakers of Greek Macedonia
Casey Demons players
Victorian State of Origin players
Three-time VFL/AFL Premiership players